Sean Qitsualik-Tinsley is a Canadian writer. He was a winner of the Burt Award for First Nations, Métis and Inuit Literature in 2015 for Skraelings, which he cowrote with his wife Rachel Qitsualik-Tinsley. The book was also a shortlisted finalist for the Governor General's Award for English-language children's literature at the 2014 Governor General's Awards.

The duo also cowrote the 2008 book Qanuq Pinngurnirmata, a volume of Inuit mythology. The book was reissued in 2015 as How Things Came to Be: Inuit Stories of Creation.

Of Scottish and Mohawk heritage, he was a second-place finalist in the Writers of the Future competition in 2005 for his short story "Green Angel".

Publications

References

External links

Sean Qitsualik-Tinsley's biography on Inuit.uqam.ca
Rachel and Sean Qitsualik-Tinsley at Inhabit Media

21st-century Canadian novelists
Canadian male novelists
Métis writers
Living people
Canadian writers of young adult literature
21st-century Canadian short story writers
Canadian science fiction writers
Canadian Mohawk people
Writers from Nunavut
Canadian male short story writers
21st-century Canadian male writers
Year of birth missing (living people)